The Postman is the soundtrack, on the Hollywood Records label, of the 1994 Academy Award-winning film The Postman (original title: Il Postino). The original score was composed by Luis Enríquez Bacalov.

Besides the film's score, composed by Bacalov, the soundtrack includes Pablo Neruda's poems recited by Sting, Miranda Richardson, Wesley Snipes, Ralph Fiennes, Ethan Hawke, Rufus Sewell, Glenn Close, Samuel L. Jackson, Andy García, Willem Dafoe, Madonna, Vincent Perez, and Julia Roberts.

The album won the Academy Award for Best Original Dramatic Score and the BAFTA Award for Best Film Music.

Track listing

References

Comedy-drama film soundtracks
1995 soundtrack albums
Cultural depictions of Pablo Neruda
Scores that won the Best Original Score Academy Award